The 2016–17 season was Irish provincial rugby union side Connacht Rugby's sixteenth season competing in the Pro12, and the team's twenty-first season as a professional side. It was Pat Lam's fourth and final season in charge of the side.

Connacht finished the season in eight place in the league. As well as playing in the Pro12, Connacht competed in the Champions Cup in Europe, finishing third in their pool, level on points with Toulouse, who advanced to the knockout stage as one of the best runners-up. The second-tier side the Connacht Eagles competed in the 2016–17 British and Irish Cup, finishing bottom of their pool.

Background
Connacht started the season with a new coaching team. Backs and kicking coach Andre Bell left his role to return to his family in New Zealand. Head performance analyst and assistant attack coach Conor McPhillips took over coaching of the backs, while the team's former head coach Eric Elwood took over coaching kicking. The close season also saw the departure of the side's all-time record try-scorer Fionn Carr who scored 42 tries over two spells with the province. During the off-season, the team's homeground, the Galway Sportsground underwent renovations with the addition of a seated stand increasing its capacity to 8,100.

Coaching and management team
Note: Flags indicate national union as has been defined under WR eligibility rules. Individuals may hold more than one non-WR nationality.

Players

Senior playing squad

 Players qualified to play for Ireland on dual nationality or residency grounds*
 Senior 15's internationally capped players in bold
 Irish Provinces were limited to four non-Irish eligible (NIE) players and one non-Irish qualified player (NIQ or "Project Player"). Connacht Rugby is exempted from this under a separate development arrangement

Academy squad

 year 3
 year 2
 year 3
 year 1
 year 2
 year 3
 year 2
 year 1
 year 1
 year 2
 year 3
 year 3

 year 1
 year 2
 year 3
 year 1
 year 3
 year 1
 year 2
 year 2

Senior Team Transfers

Players in
HK  Shane Delahunt promoted from academy
PR  John Andress from  Munster
PR  Conor Carey from  Nottingham
PR  Peter McCabe from  Munster (loan)
PR  Dominic Robertson-McCoy from  Northland
PR  Ivan Soroka from  Clontarf
LK  James Cannon from  Wasps
LK  Lewis Stevenson from  Exeter Chiefs
FL  James Connolly promoted from academy
FL  Naulia Dawai from  Otago
FL  Rory Moloney promoted from academy
FL  Seán O'Brien promoted from academy
FH  Marnitz Boshoff from  Lions
FH  Steve Crosbie from  Munster
CE  Tom Farrell from  Bedford Blues
CE  Eoin Griffin from  London Irish
CE  Rory Parata promoted from the academy
CE  Peter Robb promoted from the academy
WG  Stacey Ili from  Auckland
WG  Cian Kelleher from  Leinster
FB  Josh Rowland from  Ireland Sevens

Players out
HK  Jason Harris-Wright to  London Irish
PR  Rodney Ah You to  Ulster
PR  Nathan White retired
LK  Aly Muldowney to  Grenoble
N8  George Naoupu to  Harlequins
SH  Ian Porter to  Banbridge
FH  AJ MacGinty to  Sale Sharks
CE  Conor Finn to  Buccaneers
CE  Robbie Henshaw to  Leinster
CE  Dave McSharry retired
CE  Api Pewhairangi to  London Broncos
WG  Fionn Carr to  Naas

Results

Pro12

After 40 minutes of play, the match was "abandoned due to adverse weather conditions causing considerable risk to both the players and spectators". Zebre were leading 22–10 (3 tries to 1) when the match was abandoned. A rescheduled fixture was played on 1 April 2017.

Game rescheduled from 17 September 2016.

Champions Cup

Pool 1

Assistant referee Mathieu Raynal replaced the original referee Jérôme Garcès on the 73rd minute of the game after pulling a hamstring.

Champions Cup play-offs

Semi-final

Notes

References

2016–17
2016–17 Pro12 by team
2016–17 in Irish rugby union
2016–17 European Rugby Champions Cup by team